Bungie, Inc. is an American video game company based in Bellevue, Washington. It is a studio owned by Sony Interactive Entertainment. The company was established in May 1991 by Alex Seropian, who later brought in programmer Jason Jones after publishing Jones' game Minotaur: The Labyrinths of Crete. Originally based in Chicago, Illinois, the company concentrated on Macintosh games during its early years and created two successful video game franchises called Marathon and Myth. An offshoot studio, Bungie West, produced Oni, published in 2001 and owned by Take-Two Interactive, which held a 19.9% ownership stake at the time.

Microsoft acquired Bungie in 2000, and its project Halo: Combat Evolved was repurposed as a launch title for Microsoft's Xbox console. Halo became the Xbox's "killer app", selling millions of copies and spawning the Halo franchise. On October 5, 2007, Bungie announced that it had split from Microsoft and become a privately held independent company, Bungie LLC, while Microsoft retained ownership of the Halo franchise intellectual property. It signed a ten-year publishing deal with Activision in April 2010. Their first project was the 2014 first-person shooter, Destiny, which was followed by Destiny 2 in 2017. In January 2019, Bungie announced it was ending this partnership, and would take over publishing for Destiny. Sony Interactive Entertainment completed its acquisition of Bungie in July 2022, with Bungie remaining as an independent and multi-platform studio and publisher.

Among Bungie's side projects is Bungie.net, the company's website, which includes company information, forums, and statistics-tracking and integration with many of its games. Bungie.net serves as the platform from which Bungie sells company-related merchandise out of the Bungie Store and runs other projects, including Bungie Aerospace, a charitable organization called The Bungie Foundation, a podcast, and online publications about game topics. The company is known for its informal and dedicated workplace culture.

History

Background and founding (1990–1993)
In the early 1990s, Alex Seropian was pursuing a mathematics degree at the University of Chicago, as the university did not offer undergraduate degrees in computer science. Living at home shortly before graduation, his father's wishes for him to get a job convinced Seropian to start his own game company instead.

Seropian's first video game was a Pong clone, written and released nearly 20 years after the original, called Gnop! (Pong spelled backwards).  The game was created in 1990, almost a year before Bungie's official incorporation, but was released under the Bungie name and is considered by Bungie as its first game. Seropian released Gnop! free of charge, but sold the source code for the game for US$15. Gnop! was later included in several compilations of early Bungie games, including the Marathon Trilogy Box Set and the Mac Action Sack.

Seropian officially founded Bungie Software Products Corporation in May 1991 to publish Operation: Desert Storm. Seropian culled funding from friends and family, assembling the game boxes and writing the disks himself. Operation: Desert Storm sold 2,500 copies, and Seropian looked for another game to publish.

Seropian met programmer Jason Jones in an artificial intelligence course at the University of Chicago. Jones was a longtime programmer who was porting a game he wrote, called Minotaur, from an Apple II to the Macintosh platform. Jones recalled, "I didn't really know [Alex] in the class. I think he actually thought I was a dick because I had a fancy computer". Seropian and Jones partnered to release the role-playing video game as Minotaur: The Labyrinths of Crete in 1992; while Jones finished the coding, Seropian handled design and publicity. The game relied on then-uncommon internet modems and AppleTalk connections for play and sold around 2,500 copies, and developed a devoted following. Both Seropian and Jones are considered co-founders of Bungie.

The team focused on the Macintosh platform, not Windows-based personal computers, because the Mac market was more open and Jones had been raised on the platform. While Jones was responsible for many of the creative and technical aspects, Seropian was a businessman and marketer. "What I liked about [Seropian] was that he never wasted any money", Jones recalled. With no money to hire other personnel, the two assembled Minotaur boxes by hand in Seropian's apartment. While the pair remained low on funds—Seropian's wife was largely supporting him—the modest success of Minotaur gave the duo enough money to develop another project.

Inspired by the shooter game Wolfenstein 3D, Jones wrote a 3D game engine for the Mac. Bungie's next game was intended to be a 3D port of Minotaur, but Jones and Seropian found that Minotaurs top-down perspective gameplay did not translate well to the 3D perspective, and did not want to rely on modems. Instead, they developed a new storyline for the first-person shooter that became Pathways into Darkness, released in 1993. Jones did the coding, with his friend Colin Brent creating the game's art. The game was a critical and commercial success, winning awards including Inside Mac Games' "Adventure Game of the Year" and Macworlds "Best Role-Playing Game".

Pathways beat sales expectations and became Bungie's first commercial success. Bungie moved from a one-bedroom apartment to a studio in Chicago's South Side on South Halsted Street; Seropian and Jones's first full-time employee, Doug Zartman, joined in May 1994 to provide support for Pathways, but became Bungie's public relations person, honing Bungie's often sophomoric sense of humor and irreverence. Bungie composer Martin O'Donnell remembered that the studio's location, a former girls' school next to a crack house, "smelled like a frat house after a really long weekend" and reminded staff of a locale from the Silent Hill horror video games.

Marathon, Myth and Oni (1994–2001) 
Bungie's next project began as a sequel to Pathways into Darkness, but evolved into a futuristic first-person shooter called Marathon. Pathways had taught Bungie the importance of story in a game, and Marathon featured computer terminals where players could choose to learn more about the game's fiction. The studio became what one employee termed "your stereotypical vision of a small computer-game company—eating a lot of pizza, drinking a lot of Coke" while the development team worked 14 hours every day for nearly six months.

After showing the game at the Macworld Expo, Bungie was mobbed with interest and orders for the game. The game was not finished until December 14, 1994; Jones and a few other employees spent a day at a warehouse assembling boxes so that some of the orders could be filled before Christmas. The game was a critical and commercial success, and is regarded as a relatively unknown but important part of gaming history. It served as the Mac alternative to DOS PC-only games like Doom and System Shock. The game's volume of orders was unprecedented for the studio, who found that its old method of mail or phone orders could not scale to the demand and hired another company to handle the tens of thousands of orders. Marathon also brought Bungie attention from press outside the small Mac gaming market.

The first game's success led to a sequel, Marathon 2: Durandal. The series introduced several elements, including cooperative mode, which made their way to later Bungie games. The game was released November 24, 1995, and outsold its predecessor. When Bungie announced its intention to port the game to the Windows 95 operating system, however, many Mac players felt betrayed, and Bungie received a flood of negative mail. Seropian saw the value of moving into new markets and partnering with larger supply chains, although he lamented the difficult terms and "sucky" contracts distributors provided. The game released on Windows 95 in September 1996. Marathon Infinity was released the following year.

After Marathon, Bungie moved away from first-person shooters to release a strategy game, Myth: The Fallen Lords. The game stressed tactical unit management as opposed to the resource gathering model of other combat strategy titles. The Myth games won several awards and spawned a large and active online community. Myth: The Fallen Lords was the first Bungie game to be released simultaneously for both Mac and Windows platforms.

The success of Myth enabled Bungie to change Chicago offices and establish a San Jose, California based branch of the studio, Bungie West, in 1997. Bungie West's first and only game would be Oni, an action title for the Mac, PC and PlayStation 2.

Halo and buyout (2001–2007)
In 1999, Bungie announced its next product, Halo: Combat Evolved, originally intended to be a third-person shooter game for Windows and Macintosh. Halos public unveiling occurred at the Macworld Expo 1999 keynote address by Apple's then-interim-CEO Steve Jobs (after a closed-door screening at E3 in 1999).

On June 19, 2000, on the ninth anniversary of Bungie's founding, Microsoft announced that it had acquired Bungie and that Bungie would become a part of the Microsoft Game Division. Halo would be developed as an exclusive first-person shooter title for the Xbox. The reasons for Bungie accepting Microsoft's offer were varied. Jones stated that "I don't remember the details exactly, it was all a blur. We'd been talking to people for years and years—before we even published Marathon, Activision made a serious offer. But the chance to work on Xbox—the chance to work with a company that took the games seriously. Before that we worried that we'd get bought by someone who just wanted Mac ports or didn't have a clue". Martin O'Donnell, who had joined Bungie as an employee ten days before the merger was announced, remembers that the stability of the Xbox as a development platform was not the only benefit. Shortly before Myth IIs release, it was discovered versions of the game could erase a player's hard drive; the glitch led to a massive recall of the games right before they shipped, which cost Bungie nearly one million dollars. O'Donnell stated in a Bungie podcast that this recall created some financial uncertainty, although accepting the offer was not something Bungie "had to do". Seropian and Jones had refused to accept Microsoft's offer until the entire studio agreed to the buyout.

As a result of the buyout, the rights to Myth and Oni were transferred to Take-Two Interactive (which at the time owned 19.9% of the studio) as part of the three-way deal between Microsoft, Bungie and Take-Two Interactive; most of the original Oni developers were able to continue working on Oni until its release in 2001. Halo: Combat Evolved, meanwhile, went on to become a critically acclaimed hit, selling more than 6.5 million copies, and becoming the Xbox's flagship franchise.

Halos success led to Bungie creating three sequels. Halo 2 was released on November 9, 2004, making more than $125 million on release day and setting a record in the entertainment industry. Halo 3 was released on September 25, 2007, and surpassed Halo 2s records, making $170 million in its first twenty-four hours of release. Following Halo 3's unprecedented success on September 22, 2009, Bungie released its third and final iteration, Halo 3: ODST which would go on to gross approximately $160 million in its first twenty-four hours of release.

Independent company (2007–2022)
On October 1, 2007, Microsoft and Bungie announced that Bungie was splitting off from its parent and becoming a privately held limited liability company named Bungie, LLC. As outlined in a deal between the two, Microsoft would retain a minority stake and continue to partner with Bungie on publishing and marketing both Halo and future projects, with the Halo intellectual property belonging to Microsoft.

While Bungie planned on revealing a new game at E3 2008, Bungie studio head Harold Ryan announced that the unveiling was canceled. Almost three months later, Bungie announced that the new game was a prequel and expansion to Halo 3 titled Halo 3: Recon. The next month, Bungie changed the game's title from Halo 3: Recon to Halo 3: ODST. At E3 2009, Bungie and Microsoft revealed the company was developing another Halo-related game, Halo: Reach, for release in 2010. Reach was the last game in the Halo franchise to be developed by Bungie.

Bungie continued expanding, though it did not commit to details about new projects and ship dates. The company grew from roughly 120 employees in May 2008 to 165 in June 2009, outgrowing the studio Microsoft developed. Ryan helped redesign a former multiplex movie theater in Bellevue into new Bungie offices, with  replacing the  the company occupied previously.

In April 2010, Bungie announced that it was entering into a 10-year publishing agreement with publisher Activision Blizzard. Under Bungie's agreement with Activision, new intellectual property developed by Bungie will be owned by Bungie, not Activision, in a deal similar to the Electronic Arts Partners Program.

On June 30, 2011, Bungie announced the "Bungie Aerospace" project; its slogan, "Per audacia ad astra", translates to "Boldly to the stars". The project is intended to provide independent game developers with publishing, resources, and support, including access to the Bungie.net platform. In November 2011, Bungie Aerospace published its first game, Crimson: Steam Pirates, for iOS, developed by startup video game developer Harebrained Schemes. In addition to publishing and distributing Crimson, Bungie Aerospace provided players with statistical support and a dedicated discussion forum on Bungie.net.

In 2013, Bungie announced Destiny, which launched for the PlayStation 3, PlayStation 4, Xbox 360, and Xbox One platforms on September 9, 2014. During January 2016, Ryan stepped down as president and Pete Parsons, who had been the company's chief operating officer and executive producer since 2002, became its chief executive officer.

Chinese video game conglomerate NetEase had invested $100 million into Bungie in 2018, in exchange for a minority stake in the company and a seat on the company's board of directors.

Bungie terminated its publishing deal with Activision in 2019, after eight years; as per their agreement, Bungie retained all rights to Destiny and will self-publish future installments and expansions. This included transitioning Destiny 2 from using Activision's Battle.net to Steam. Bungie's communications director David Dague dispelled ideas that Activision was a "prohibitive overlord" that limited Bungie's creative control, and instead stated that both companies amicably split due to different ideas of where the Destiny franchise should head.

Bungie announced a major expansion of its firm in February 2021. In addition to more than doubling its headquarters space in Bellevue, Washington, Bungie announced plans to open a new studio in Amsterdam by 2022. This would support additional staff not only for Destiny but additional media related to Destiny outside of video games, as well as a new intellectual property unrelated to Destiny that Bungie expects to release by 2025.

Acquisition by Sony Interactive Entertainment (2022–present)

On January 31, 2022, Sony Interactive Entertainment announced its intent to acquire Bungie for $3.6 billion. While Bungie would become part of the PlayStation family of studios it would remain an independent subsidiary under Sony in development and publishing and would not be part of PlayStation Studios. Instead, Sony's investment would help Bungie with hiring for developers to expand their work on the Destiny franchise and other planned games. Both companies stated that the deal would not affect platform availability or exclusivity for Destiny 2 but instead was geared towards media beyond video games that Bungie had been interested in pursuing for some time. Bungie, in return, would help Sony enter the live service games market, as Sony had announced plans to launch at least ten such games by 2026 in an investors' presentation following the Bungie acquisition announcement. Sony also said the Bungie acquisition will help Sony to become more multiplatform.

Of the $3.6 billion, Sony anticipated that at least $1.2 billion will be used as incentives for retention of Bungie's current employees. In May, it was reported that the Federal Trade Commission is opening an inquiry into the acquisition, requesting more information about it a week prior. It is expected to delay the acquisition by at least six months. The acquisition was closed by July 15, 2022, making Bungie a subsidiary under Sony Interactive Entertainment.

Bungie.net
Bungie.net serves as the main portal for interaction between company staff and the community surrounding Bungie's games. When Bungie was bought by Microsoft, the site was seen as in competition with Microsoft's own Xbox.com site, but community management eventually won out as the bigger concern. The site has been redesigned several times.

During Bungie's involvement with the Halo franchise, the site recorded statistics for each game played. This information included statistics on each player in the game, and a map of the game level showing where kills occurred, called "heatmaps". On January 31, 2012, Bungie announced that, as of March 31, 2012, Bungie.net would no longer update Halo game statistics and Halo player service records, host new user-generated Halo content, or operate Halos "Bungie Pro" service. Bungie's cessation of these services on March 31 completed the transition process of all data for Halo games being managed by 343 Industries. Bungie.net records player's statistics for their game franchise Destiny. In addition to the collection of data and the management of Destiny player's accounts, the website serves as a form of communication between Bungie and the community.

While Bungie had long provided places for fans to congregate and talk about games, as well as releasing new information and screenshots over Bungie.net, it historically had made less effort and been less successful at providing access to the inside workings of Bungie and its staff. As part of a move to become more familiar with fans, Bungie recruited recognized and respected voices from the fan community, including writers Luke Smith, Eric Osborne, and others.

Bungie also has an iOS and Google Play application that allows provides news, inventory management, and group finding for their game Destiny on the go.

Culture

Martin O'Donnell described Bungie's workplace culture as "a slightly irreverent attitude, and not corporate, bureaucratic or business-focused"; artist Shi Kai Wang noted that when he walked into Bungie for an interview, "I realized that I was the one who was over-dressed, [and] I knew this was the place I wanted to work". Bungie's content manager and podcast host, Frank O'Connor, comically noted that at a GameStop conference, the Bungie team was told to wear business casual, to which O'Connor replied "We [Bungie] don't do business casual".

This informal, creative culture was one of the reasons Microsoft was interested in acquiring Bungie, although game designer Jordan Weisman said that Microsoft came close to destroying the company's development culture, as it had with the now-defunct FASA Studio. Studio head Harold Ryan emphasized that even when Bungie was bought by Microsoft, the team was still independent:
One of the first things [Microsoft] tried after acquiring Bungie, after first attempting to fully assimilate them, was to move Bungie into a standard Microsoft building with the rest of the game group. But unlike the rest of the teams they'd brought in previously, Bungie didn't move into Microsoft corporate offices – we tore all of the walls out of that section of the building and sat in a big open environment. Luckily Alex and Jason [Seropian and Jones, Bungie's founders] were pretty steadfast at the time about staying somewhat separate and isolated.
In 2007, Microsoft eventually moved the studio to Kirkland, Washington, where it reincorporated as Bungie, Inc. Despite the move, financial analyst Roger Ehrenberg declared the Bungie-Microsoft marriage "doomed to fail" due to these fundamental differences. Bungie also pointed out that it was tired of new intellectual property being cast aside to work on the Halo franchise. Edge described the typical Bungie employee as "simultaneously irreverent and passionately loyal; fiercely self-critical; full of excitement at the company's achievements, no matter how obscure; [and] recruited from its devoted fanbase".

The Bungie workplace is highly informal, with new and old staff willing to challenge each other on topics, such as fundamental game elements. Staff are able to publicly criticize their own games and each other. Fostering studio cooperation and competition, Bungie holds events such as the "Bungie Pentathlon", in which staff square off in teams playing games such as Halo, Pictionary, Dance Dance Revolution, and Rock Band. Bungie also faced off against professional eSports teams and other game studios in Halo during "Humpdays", with the results of the multiplayer matches being posted on Bungie.net.

Bungie's staff and fans, known as the "Seventh Column", have banded together for charity and other causes. After Hurricane Katrina, Bungie was one of several game companies to announce its intention to help those affected by the hurricane, with Bungie donating the proceeds of special T-shirts to the American Red Cross; after the 2010 Haiti earthquake, Bungie sold "Be a Hero" T-shirts and donated money to the Red Cross for every Halo 3 or ODST player on Xbox Live who wore a special heart-shaped emblem. Other charity work Bungie has done included auctioning off a painting of "Mister Chief" by O'Connor, a Halo 2 soda machine from Bungie's offices, and collaborating with Child's Play auctions. In 2011, Bungie formed a nonprofit organization, named Bungie Foundation.

In December 2021, IGN reported from interviews with 26 former and current employees that there had been past and some current issues with a male-dominated work culture and crunch time that was discriminatory towards female employees since around 2011, but the company more recently had been working to improve these issues, previously parting ways with the majority of people mentioned in the article. Parsons wrote a response about Bungie's commitment to improve the workplace culture, which had aligned with statements from more recent employees that had spoken to IGN. Parsons apologized to any employee who "ever experienced anything less than a safe, fair, and professional working environment at Bungie", and stated of several efforts that the company was making to eliminate any type of "rockstar" attitude that may exist at the studio.

Games developed

Related companies
Many of Bungie's employees have left the company to form their own studios. Double Aught was a short-lived company composed of several former Bungie team members, founded by Greg Kirkpatrick. Seropian left to form Wideload Games, developer of Stubbs the Zombie in Rebel Without a Pulse, and later co-founded Industrial Toys. Other companies include Giant Bite, founded by Hamilton Chu (producer on Halo and Oni) and Michael Evans (project lead on Oni), and Certain Affinity, founded by Max Hoberman (the multiplayer design lead for Halo 2 and Halo 3). Certain Affinity's team included former Bungie employees David Bowman and Chad Armstrong (who later returned to Bungie). The studio collaborated with Bungie in releasing the last two downloadable maps for Halo 2 and the downloadable Defiant Map Pack for Halo: Reach.  343 Industries, a game studio formed by Microsoft to manage the Halo series following the launch of Halo: Reach, also includes a few former Bungie employees, including Frank O'Connor. In 2015, long-time Bungie employee Martin O'Donnell started a new game studio known as Highwire Games. In 2016, former Bungie CEO and studio head Harold Ryan founded a new game studio known as ProbablyMonsters.

References

External links

 

 
1991 establishments in Illinois
2000 mergers and acquisitions
Companies based in Bellevue, Washington
American companies established in 1991
Video game companies established in 1991
Video game companies of the United States
Video game development companies
Former Microsoft subsidiaries
Sony Interactive Entertainment
2022 mergers and acquisitions